Hyoryong Sagong clan is one of the Korean clans. Their Bon-gwan is in Gunwi County, North Gyeongsang Province. According to the research held in 2015, the number of Hyoryong Sagong clan was 4297. Sagong clan began when Ga Sin accepted Minister of Works, the government post, and got his surname after his post. Their founder was  who worked as minister of rites (禮部侍郎, Lǐbu Shilang) in Tang dynasty during Emperor Xizong of Tang’s reign. He was naturalized in Silla to avoid conflictions.

See also 
 Korean clan names of foreign origin

References

External links 
 

 
Sagong clans
Korean clan names of Chinese origin